Tichenor is a variant of Tickner, an English topographic surname for someone who lived at a crossroad or a fork in the road.. 

A more likely origin for the surname is that of a family located in 16th century Sussex whose name derives from the village of Itchenor, near Chichester, previously named in Anglo Saxon, "Iccen Ora" which translates as "Icca's Landing Place."   

Notable people with the surname include:

 Bridget Bate Tichenor (1917–1990), Mexican surrealist painter
 Dylan Tichenor (born 1968), American film editor
 Edna Tichenor (1901–1965), American actress
 George C. Tichenor (1838–1902), member of the Board of General Appraisers
 George H. Tichenor (1837–1923), American physician
 Harold Lee Tichenor (born 1946), Canadian film producer and writer
 Henry M. Tichenor (1858–1922), American writer and magazine writer
 Isaac Tichenor (1754–1838), American lawyer and politician. Governor of and Senator from Vermont
 Isaac T. Tichenor (1825–1902), president of the Agricultural and Mechanical College of Alabama, now known as Auburn University
 Martin Tichenor (1625–1681), early colonist and original settler of Newark, New Jersey, origin of surname in U.S.
 Stephen W. Tichenor (1813–1883), judge and mayor of  Orange, New Jersey
 Todd Frederick Tichenor (born 1976), American baseball umpire
 Trebor Jay Tichenor (1940–2014), American pianist, composer and a recognized authority on Scott Joplin and the ragtime era
 Vernon Tichenor (1815–1892), American politician
 Walter Reynolds Tichenor (1877–1935), college football player and coach at Auburn and Georgia
 Warren W. Tichenor (born 1960), American diplomat
 Captain William V. Tichenor (1813–1887), founder of Port Orford, Oregon

See also 
 
 Tickner
 Ticknor
 Tichnor Brothers, Boston postcard company

References 

English-language surnames